Jellabies (also known as Jellikins or The Jellies) is a British children's animated television series that aired on the Australian television network ABC Kids from 18 May 1998 until 2003. It was also shown in Germany, (Super RTL), U.S. (Fox Family Channel, now Freeform), The Netherlands (Kindernet), France (TF! Jeunesse), and the United Kingdom (GMTV). The target audience is for children ages two to six.

It was one of the first fully CGI-animated series in the world.

Format
The program was conceived and developed in Worcestershire, UK by Jonny Lewis, a 3d artist/animator and Optical Image Ltd, a small TV/video editing house, using CGI animation. The show was narrated by Rik Mayall. The Jellabies are jelly-made children that live in the Jolly Jelly World, which is the magical land at the end of the rainbow, where their first job is to make rainbows. (for which they have a machine called the Jelliscope, a computer/teleporter/rainbow generator which is constantly monitoring weather conditions around the world) Although each Jellaby has its own vehicle to drive around in, their main use of travelling long distances around Jelly Land is on the "Jelly Train", a train that only consists of a cab (without any actual locomotive) and one passenger car. The show premiered in 1998 and ended in 2003.

Jellabies is also known as Jellikins in certain parts of the world, including the United Kingdom. This version is exactly the same as the Jellabies in every way, except the characters' heads were changed to look like gummy bears. However, Duffy the dragon remained the same. This version aired on GMTV in the United Kingdom until 2004.

History 
Jonny Lewis designed and created the characters and developed the pilot episode with his brother Mikel Lewis, using 3D Studio Max software. It was loosely based on Jelly Babies candies. In the early months, before funding, Jonny Lewis lived in a dusty basement in Malvern so he could afford to develop the show on his home PC. The pilot led to the series being commissioned by GMTV and then in many other countries around the world. It was the first British fully 3D computer animated series to make it on to television.

Optical Image sealed sponsorship from a confectionery company. Other animators who made significant input were Meena Kamurai Pai, Andrew Lindsay, Richard Smart, Andy Day, Ian Friend, Harjit Birdi, making each episode with only five days to complete each one in order to meet the schedule.

Music written and composed by Dave Lowe and Vo Fletcher.

Characters and voice cast
Each of the six Jellabies represent the colours of the rainbow.

Main 

 Narrator (Rik Mayall)
 Strum: Lives at the train station, is purple, is the first Jellaby, and is the musical Jellaby who plays the saxophone.
 Bouncey: The second Jellaby who lives in a bumper car, and is yellow, the same colour as lemons and the sun.
 Denny: The third Jellaby who lives in a boat on the Jelly Lake, and is blue, the same colour as the sky and the world's oceans.
 Pepper: The fourth Jellaby who lives in a treehouse and is red the same colour as ripe strawberries and apples.
 Amber and Coral: The last two Jellabies who are twin sisters and are orange and pink, respectively. Amber lives in a hot air balloon and Coral lives in a house made out of building blocks and toys which she can use to rebuild her house as she pleases.

Supporting 
 Duffy: The only non-Jellaby character in the entire show, is a dragon who lives in the Jelly Caves.

Episodes

Season 1 (1998-99)
1. Caterpillar

2. Circus

3. Pepper's Den

4. Hide and Seek

5. Apple

6. Seeds

7. Burst Balloon

8. Snow

9. Music

10. Drum

11. Drumsticks

12. The Jolly Jelly World Fair

13. Waiting

Season 2 (1999)

1. Birthday

2. Echoes

3. Sky

4. Egg

5. Monster

6. Sheep

Season 3 (1999)

1. Train Trouble

2. Balloon

3. Jack in the Box

4. Lost Voice

5. Sneezes

6. Invisible

7. Runaway Train

8. Rescue

9. Seal

10. Super Jelly

11. Bridge

12. Race

13. Jellybeard

Season 4 (1999)

1. Shadow

2. Sun

3. Jelly Day

4. Animals

5. Jelly Lake

6. Jellyphone

7. Strum's Concert

Season 5 (1999)

1. Shipwreck

2. Cave In!

3. Bouncy Ball

4. Camping

5. Tobbogan

6. Jelly Dance

7. Fancy Dress

8. Obstacles

9. Football

10. Sounds

11. Caves

12. House

13. Twins

Season 6 (1999)

1. Night

2. Poor Denny

3. Bouncing

4. Cloud

5. Butterfly

6. Parrot

7. Spring

Season 7 (1999)

1. Baa!

2. Found

3. Autumn

4. Nature

5. Zebra

6. Big

7. Magic

8. Where's Pepper?

9. Hot

10. Robot

11. Wheels

12. Chums

Season 8 (1999)

1. Rubbish

2. Silly Sax

3. Small

4. High

5. Tower

6. Footprints

7. Yuk

Season 9 (2000)

1. Jelly Disco

2. Mountain

3. Party

4. Christmas

5. Paint

6. Feelings Rhyme

Season 10 (2000)

1. Safari

2. Beach

3. Rainy Day

4. Spider Webs

5. Flying

6. Castle

7. Jellyvision

8. Dinosaurs

9. The Joly Jelly Band

10. Jungle

11. Kangaroo

12. Coral's Pet

13. Rabbit (Final Episode)

Theme song
The theme song Jellabies (also known as Jellikins) written by David Lowe and Vo Fletcher was performed by Rik Mayall (who is also the narrator of the show) and Sherrie Ashton with children from The Wyche C.E. Primary School, Malvern.

CD release
In 1999, a CD was released that was called Jellikins: Songs from the TV series which featured songs performed by Mayall.

Ride(s)
Since 2000, there has been a Jellikins roller coaster at British theme park, Fantasy Island. Amutec has got the rights to make a Jellikins coin-operated ride featuring Bouncey in his bumper car in 2001.

International Broadcast

North America
  USA
 Fox Family Channel (now Freeform)
  Canada
 Treehouse TV

Australasia
  Australia
 ABC For Kids
  New Zealand
 TV2

Asia
  South Korea
 Seoul Broadcasting System
  Taiwan
 EBC Yoyo

Europe
 United Kingdom
 GMTV
 Fox Kids
 France
TF! Jeunesse
 Germany
Super RTL
 The Netherlands
 Kindernet
Nickelodeon (Nick Jr.)

References

1990s Australian animated television series
2000s Australian animated television series
1998 Australian television series debuts
2003 Australian television series endings
Australian computer-animated television series
Australian children's animated drama television series
Australian children's animated fantasy television series
Australian preschool education television series
Treehouse TV original programming
Fox Family Channel original programming
Australian Broadcasting Corporation original programming
Animated television series about bears
Animated television series about children
Animated television series about dragons
Animated preschool education television series
1990s preschool education television series
2000s preschool education television series